Permanent Mission of Bangladesh to the United Nations is the diplomatic mission of Bangladesh to the United Nation in New York City. It is under the Ministry of Foreign Affairs.

History
Ambassador Rabab Fatima presented her credentials to the Secretary-General of the UN as Permanent Representative of Bangladesh to the UN on 06 December 2019. She replaced Ambassador Masud Bin Momen who had been in this position since   3 November 2015. Prior to Ambassador Masud Bin Momen, Dr. AK Abdul Momen was the Permanent Representative of Bangladesh to the UN from 2009 to 2015 . The mission observed Pahela Baishakh, Bengali New Year, in 2018 at its headquarters in New York City.

Key personnel

 Ambassador & Permanent Representative: Muhammad Abdul Muhith
 Minister/Deputy Permanent Representative: Md. Monwar Hossain
 Economic Minister: Md. Mahmudul Hasan, ndc
 Defense Adviser: Brigadier General Md Sadequzzaman
 First Secretary (Press): Md. Noorelahi Mina

References

1972 establishments in New York City
Bangladesh
United Nations
Bangladesh
Bangladesh and the United Nations
Bangladesh–United States relations